Harry E. Aitken (1877August 1, 1956) was a film studio executive.

Life
He was born on 4 October 1877. He grew up on a family farm near Goerke's Corners, Wisconsin.  The brothers operated Keystone Studios and eventually Harry became a partner in the Mutual Film Company.

Along with his brother Roy Aitken (1882–1978), he helped pioneer the production and distribution of movies during the early silent film era in the United States. In 1906 they founded the Western Film Exchange with John R. Freuler. They moved to California in 1908 and in 1912 founded the Mutual distribution company. Within three years they were distributing movies to 45 towns and cities.

Aitken worked with D. W. Griffith and Charlie Chaplin. He was involved with the Majestic and  Reliance studios. With D. W. Griffith he co-founded Epoch Producing Company under the umbrella of which The Birth of a Nation was produced. The profits from that film were used to set up the Triangle Film Corporation in 1915, which was on a triangular plot in Culver City. This produced the Intolerance but failed soon after due to over ambition and was sold to Goldwyn.

He returned to in home town of Waukesha, Wisconsin around 1918 and died there on 1 August 1956 and is buried there in Prairie Home Cemetery.

The Wisconsin Historical Society has a collection of his papers.

Film productions
Home Sweet Home (1914) as writer
The Surgeon's Experiment (short, 1914)
The Life of General Villa (1914)
The Electric Alarm (1915)
The Birth of a Nation (1915)
Intolerance (1916)

Portrayal
Aitken is portrayed by Jim Broadbent in the 2003 HBO TV movie And Starring Pancho Villa as Himself.

References

Further reading 
 

Silent film people
1877 births
1956 deaths
People from Waukesha County, Wisconsin